Tahia Noon is a Pakistani politician who was a Member of the Provincial Assembly of the Punjab, from May 2013 to May 2018.

Early life and education
She was born on 20 May 1973 in Karachi.

She earned the degree of Bachelor of Arts (Hons) in 1996 and received the degree of Master of Arts in Mental & Moral Sciences from Trinity College, Dublin.

Political career

She was elected to the Provincial Assembly of the Punjab as a candidate of Pakistan Muslim League (N) (PML-N) on a reserved seat for women in 2013 Pakistani general election.

She was re-elected to the Provincial Assembly of the Punjab as a candidate of PML-N on a reserved seat for women in 2018 Pakistani general election.

References

Living people
Women members of the Provincial Assembly of the Punjab
Punjab MPAs 2013–2018
1973 births
Pakistan Muslim League (N) MPAs (Punjab)
Tahia
Alumni of Trinity College Dublin
21st-century Pakistani women politicians